No. 162 Squadron RAF was a Royal Air Force Squadron that was a radio jamming/calibration and light bomber unit in World War II.

History

Formation and World War I
No. 162 Squadron Royal Flying Corps was formed on 1 June 1918 but it was not equipped with any aircraft and was disbanded on 4 July 1918 without becoming operational.

Reformation in World War II

The squadron reformed on 1 January 1942 at RAF Kabrit, Egypt and was equipped with Wellingtons and Blenheim aircraft on radio jamming operations against the Afrika Korps. 
It was disbanded on 25 September 1944 and reformed at RAF Bourn on 18 December 1944 as a Mosquito squadron on operations over Germany as part of the Light Night Striking Force. It was finally disbanded on 14 July 1946, having transferred to RAF Transport Command operating a mail service.

Aircraft operated

References

External links
 History of No.'s 161–165 Squadrons at RAF Web
 162 Squadron history on the official RAF website

162
Military units and formations established in 1918
1918 establishments in the United Kingdom
Military units and formations in Mandatory Palestine in World War II